The 1927 AAA Championship Car season consisted of 11 races, beginning in Culver City, California on March 6 and concluding in Salem, New Hampshire on October 12.  There were also three non-championship races.  The AAA National Champion was Peter DePaolo and the Indianapolis 500 winner was George Souders.

Schedule and results
All races running on Dirt/Brick/Board Oval.

Indianapolis 500 was AAA-sanctioned and counted towards the 1927 AIACR World Manufacturers' Championship title.

 Scheduled for 200 miles, stopped due to fire on track.
 Extra race added after wreckage cleared and damaged track sections repaired.

Leading National Championship standings

References

See also
 1927 Indianapolis 500

AAA Championship Car season
AAA Championship Car
1927 in American motorsport